Colleen Townsend, Mrs. Louis Evans (born December 21, 1928) is an American actress, author and humanitarian.

Early years
Townsend was born in Glendale, California.  She attended Brigham Young University, leaving during her sophomore year to pursue a film career.

Life and career
Townsend began a film career in 1944, appearing in minor roles in several films. By 1946, she was appearing on the cover of magazines, and in 1947, she was signed to a contract by 20th Century Fox. She was the subject of a cover story for Life in 1948, which discussed the way in which major studios groomed and manufactured their stars, using Townsend's story as an example. The studio created a photographic calendar for her to "put [her] face in every home, office and barracks in America all year around". Hedda Hopper was quoted as saying that Townsend was "going places."

She played a featured role in the film The Walls of Jericho (1948), and she was billed third behind Dan Dailey and Celeste Holm in Chicken Every Sunday (1949). Her biggest success was in the 1950 film When Willie Comes Marching Home, in which she was paired with Dan Dailey. Again Pioneers (1950), which she wrote, provided her with her first lead role.

She grew up attending the Church of Jesus Christ of Latter-day Saints, and in 1948, she became active in the Hollywood Presbyterian Church. In 1950, Townsend left her acting career and married long-time friend Louis H. Evans, Jr. who was a seminary student at the time at San Francisco Theologic Seminary. Rev. Louis H. Evans, Jr. was the founding pastor of Bel Air Presbyterian Church, which began in the Evans home. Bel Air Presbyterian Church exists today as the largest Presbyterian congregation in the Los Angeles area.

Later, the couple met and became friends with Billy and Ruth Graham. Townsend, now billed as Colleen Evans, returned to films briefly, starring in two films produced by the Billy Graham Evangelistic Association: Oiltown, U.S.A. (1950) and Souls in Conflict (1955).

Post-acting
Colleen and Louis Evans moved to Washington, D.C. where he served at National Presbyterian Church. Thereafter she dedicated herself to humanitarian work, specifically in relation to racial or religious discrimination, human rights, and the role of women in society. She partnered with her husband in ministry and served on the board of World Vision. She served as the first female chair of the Billy Graham Crusade in 1986.

As Colleen Townsend Evans, she wrote several books.

Family

Colleen and Louis had four children. She has nine grandchildren and six great-grandchildren. Colleen and Louis Evans retired to Bass Lake, California. Louis Evans died in 2008 of ALS. Colleen Townsend Evans resides in Naples, Florida.

Filmography

References

External links

Colleen Townsend on the cover of Life magazine, August 30 1948

1928 births
Living people
American film actresses
Actresses from Glendale, California
Actresses from California
American Christians
20th Century Studios contract players
American Christian writers
Former Latter Day Saints
American humanitarians
Women humanitarians
San Francisco Theological Seminary alumni
American women writers
Writers from Glendale, California
Activists from California
American Presbyterians
Christians from California
Converts to Presbyterianism
20th-century American actresses